Man of Many Parts is an album by multi-instrumentalist and composer Buddy Collette recorded at sessions in 1956 and released on the Contemporary label.

Reception

The Allmusic review by Scott Yanow states: "Collette is showcased on tenor, alto, clarinet, and his strongest ax, flute. He also contributed nine of the dozen selections".

Track listing
All compositions by Buddy Collette except where noted.
 "Cycle" - 2:51
 "Makin' Whoopee" (Gus Kahn, Walter Donaldson) - 3:36
 "Ruby" (Heinz Eric Roemheld, Mitchell Parish) - 2:48
 "St. Andrews Place Blues" - 3:42
 "Cheryl Ann" - 4:35
 "Sunset Drive" - 3:20
 "Jazz City Blues" - 4:43
 "Slappy's Tune" - 3:39
 "Frenesí" (Alberto Dominguez) - 2:42
 "Santa Monica" - 3:43
 "Jungle Pipe" - 4:02
 "Zan" - 3:20

Recorded at Contemporary's studio in Los Angeles on February 13, 1956 (tracks 1, 3, 8 & 10), February 24, 1956 (tracks 2, 6, 7 & 9) and April 17, 1956 (tracks 4, 5, 11 & 12).

Personnel
Buddy Collette - tenor saxophone, alto saxophone, flute, clarinet
Gerald Wilson - trumpet (tracks 1, 3, 8 & 10)
David Wells - bass trumpet (tracks 1, 3, 8 & 10)
William E. Green - alto saxophone (tracks 1, 3, 8 & 10)
Jewell Grant - baritone saxophone (tracks 1, 3, 8 & 10)
Barney Kessel - guitar (tracks 4, 5, 11 & 12)
Ernie Freeman (tracks 1, 3-5, 8 & 1-12), Gerald Wiggins (tracks 1, 3, 8 & 10) - piano
Red Callender (tracks 1, 3, 8 & 10), Joe Comfort (tracks 4, 5, 11 & 12), Gene Wright (tracks 2, 6, 7 & 9) - bass
Max Albright (tracks 1, 3, 8 & 10), Larry Bunker (tracks 2, 6, 7 & 9), Bill Richmond (tracks 4, 5, 11 & 12) - drums

References

Contemporary Records albums
Buddy Collette albums
1957 albums